Leucostoma persoonii is a plant pathogen, which causes perennial canker (also referred to as Cytospora canker and Valsa canker or Leucostoma canker).
On Species Fungorum the current name is given as Cytospora leucostoma (Pers.) Sacc., (1881)

References

External links 
 Index Fungorum
 USDA ARS Fungal Database

Diaporthales
Fungal plant pathogens and diseases